Bayguzhino (Bayğuja) is a rural locality or village in Verkhnegaleyevsky Selsoviet, Zilairsky District, Bashkortostan, Russia. The population was 253 as of 2010.

Geography 
Bayguzhino has only two streets, and is connected by another road to the district's administrative centre, Zilair, located 126 km southeast of the village. Mikhaylovka is the nearest rural locality.

References 

Rural localities in Zilairsky District